Michael McCaffrey (18 February 1878 – 31 December 1948) was an Australian cricketer. He played in five first-class matches for Queensland between 1905 and 1912.

See also
 List of Queensland first-class cricketers

References

External links
 

1878 births
1948 deaths
Australian cricketers
Queensland cricketers
Cricketers from Queensland